Albanie Morin (April 30, 1921 – September 30, 1976) was a Canadian politician, who represented the electoral district of Louis-Hébert in the House of Commons of Canada from 1972 to 1976. Morin, Monique Bégin and Jeanne Sauvé, all elected in 1972, were the first women ever elected to the House of Commons from Quebec.

A member of the Liberal Party, Morin first won the seat in the 1972 election, and was reelected in 1974. She held the seat until her death in 1976, and was succeeded by Dennis Dawson in a by-election held on May 24, 1977.

External links
 

1921 births
1976 deaths
20th-century Canadian women politicians
Franco-Manitoban people
Liberal Party of Canada MPs
Members of the House of Commons of Canada from Quebec
Women in Quebec politics
Women members of the House of Commons of Canada